Sayyid Mohammad Kazem Shariatmadari, also spelled Shariat-Madari (5 January 1906 – 3 April 1986), was an Iranian Grand Ayatollah. He favoured the traditional Shiite practice of keeping clerics away from governmental positions and was a critic of Supreme Leader Ruhollah Khomeini, denouncing the taking hostage of diplomats at the US embassy in Tehran.

Biography

Early life and education
Born in Tabriz in 1906, Shariatmadari was among the most senior leading Twelver Shia clerics in Iran and Iraq and was known for his forward looking and liberal views. After the death of Supreme and Grand Ayatollah Borujerdi (Marja' Mutlaq) in 1961 he became one of the leading marjas, with followers in Iran, Pakistan, India, Lebanon, Kuwait and the southern Persian Gulf states.

In 1963, he prevented the Shah from executing Ayatollah Khomeini by recognizing him as a Grand Ayatollah, since according to the Iranian constitution a Marja' could not be executed. Khomeini was exiled instead. As the leading Mujtahid he was the head of Qom's seminary until Khomeini's arrival. He was in favour of the traditional Shiite view of keeping clerics away from governmental positions and a vehement critic of Khomeini. He headed the Centre for Islamic Study and Publications and was the administrator of the Dar al-Tabligh and the Fatima Madrasa in Qom.

Following the demonstrations by religious dissidents in Qom in January 1978, the Shah's security forces opened fire and six people were killed. Shariatmadari condemned the killings and called for the return of Ayatollah Khomeini. He congratulated Khomeini's return, sending him a letter on 4 February 1979.

Political positions
Shariatmadari was at odds with Khomeini's interpretation of the concept of the "Leadership of Jurists" (Wilayat al-faqih), according to which clerics may assume political leadership if the current government is found to rule against the interests of the public. Contrary to Khomeini, Shariatmadari adhered to the traditional Twelver Shiite view, according to which the clergy ought to serve society and remain aloof from politics. Furthermore, Shariatmadari strongly believed that no system of government can be coerced upon a people, no matter how morally correct it may be. Instead, people need to be able to freely elect a government. He believed a democratic government where the people administer their own affairs is perfectly compatible with the correct interpretation of the Leadership of the Jurists. Before the revolution, Shariatmadari wanted a return to the system of constitutional monarchy that was enacted in the Iranian Constitution of 1906. He encouraged peaceful demonstrations to avoid bloodshed. According to such a system, the Shah's power was limited and the ruling of the country was mostly in the hands of the people through a parliamentary system. Mohammad Reza Pahlavi, the then Shah of Iran, and his allies, however, took the pacifism of clerics such as Shariatmadari as a sign of weakness. The Shah's government declared a ban on Muharram commemorations hoping to stop revolutionary protests. After a series of severe crack downs on the people and the clerics and the killing and arrest of many, Shariatmadari criticized the Shah's government and declared it non-Islamic, tacitly giving support to the revolution hoping that a democracy would be established in Iran.

On 26 November 1979, Shariatmadari denounced the occupation of the US embassy in Tehran. He also criticized Khomeini's system of government as not being compatible with Islam or representing the will of the Iranian people. He severely criticized the way in which a referendum was conducted to establish Khomeini's system of government. 

In April 1982, Sadegh Ghotbzadeh was arrested on charges of plotting with military officers and clerics to bomb Khomeini's home and to overthrow the state. Ghotbzadeh denied any intentions on Khomeini's life and claimed he had sought to change the government, not overthrow the Islamic Republic. Under the torture, he also implicated Ayatollah Shariatmadari, who, he claimed, had been informed of the plan and had promised funds and his blessings if the scheme succeeded. However, the confession, extracted under torture, did not match with Shariatmadari's character and views as a pacifist. Shariatmadari's son-in-law, who was accused of serving as an intermediary between Ghotbzadeh and the Ayatollah, was sentenced to a prison term and a propaganda campaign was mounted to discredit Shariatmadari. Shariatmadari family members were arrested and tortured. According to a new book containing the memoirs of Mohammad Mohammadi Rayshahri, a leading player in the Iranian government and the head of the Hadith University in Iran, the Ayatollah himself was beaten by Rayshahri. All this forced the aging Ayatollah to go on national television and read out a confession and ask forgiveness from the man he had saved from death two decades ago. Because of his position as a mujtahid, the government could not publicly execute him. His Centre for Islamic Study and Publications was closed and he remained under house arrest until his death in 1986. He is buried in a simple grave in a cemetery in Qom. Clerics were prevented from attending his funeral prayer, drawing criticisms from Grand Ayatollah Hossein-Ali Montazeri, one of the lead players in the Iranian revolution.

Further reading

References

External links

 

1906 births
1986 deaths
Politicians from Tabriz
Muslim People's Republic Party politicians
People of the Iranian Revolution
Iranian revolutionaries
People who have been placed under house arrest in Iran
Deaths from kidney cancer
Deaths from cancer in Iran
Iranian grand ayatollahs
Iranian dissidents
20th-century Iranian politicians
Shia clerics from Tabriz